Protestants make up less than 1% of the population of Yemen. 
An American Baptist congregation is affiliated with a hospital in Jibla. Christ Church Aden, part of the Episcopal Church in Jerusalem and the Middle East, runs the charitable Ras Morbat Clinic in Aden.  The relations between Christians and Muslims contribute to religious freedom.

Denominations
 Baptist Church
 Episcopal Church in Jerusalem and the Middle East, Diocese of Cyprus and the Gulf
 Church of South Arabia

References